Neo Petritsi railway station is a railway station that servers the community of Petritsi, in  Serres in Central Macedonia, Greece. The station is located just south of the settlement but still within the settlement limits. The station is unstaffed.

History
In 2009, with the Greek debt crisis unfolding OSE's Management was forced to reduce services across the network. Timetables were cutback, routes closed, and stations left abandoned as the government-run entity attempted to reduce overheads. Services from Thessaloniki and Alexandroupolis were reduced from six to just two trains a day, reducing the reliability of services and passenger numbers. In 2017 OSE's passenger transport sector was privatised as TrainOSE, currently, a wholly owned subsidiary of Ferrovie dello Stato Italiane infrastructure, including stations, remained under the control of OSE. Since 2020, the station is served by the Proastiakos Thessaloniki services to New Railway Station. In July 2022, the station began being served by Hellenic Train, the rebranded TranOSE

Facilities
The station is little more than a halt, with only a small brick building (set back from the platform edge. As of (2022) the station is unstaffed, with no staffed booking office. There is no footbridge over the lines, though passengers can walk across the rails and not wheelchair accessible. The platform has a shelter with seating. However, there are no electronic departure and arrival screens or timetable poster boards on the platforms.

Services
It is served by two long-distance trains between Thessaloniki and Alexandroupolis. Proastiakos service from Thessaloniki New Railway Station continues on, with stopping services to Serres.

References

External links
 Vyroneia Station - National Railway Network Greek Travel Pages

Railway stations in Central Macedonia